Syringobiidae is a family of mites belonging to the order Sarcoptiformes.

Genera 

Genera:
 Dabertia Özdikmen, 2008
 Dabertina Koçak & Kemal, 2008
 Ehrnsbergeria Dabert, 2008

References 

Acari